Phryganopsis angulifascia is a moth of the subfamily Arctiinae first described by Embrik Strand in 1912. It is found in western, central and eastern Africa and is known from Ghana, Cameroon, the Democratic Republic of the Congo, Uganda and Kenya.

References 

 Strand (1912). "Weitere Schmetterlinge aus Kamerun, gesammelt von Herrn Ingenieur E. Hintz". Archiv für Naturgeschichte. 78 (A) (12): 121–131.

External links
 

Moths described in 1912
Lithosiini
Moths of Africa